The Ford Stone House, located south of Elliston in Grant County, Kentucky, was built c. 1820. It was listed on the National Register of Historic Places in 1980.

It is a one-and-a-half-story cut stone house with exterior chimneys on both ends. The house was built facing south, but was later moved and faces north.

It is located just west of Kentucky Route 1942 in the small community of Folsom, Kentucky (population 85).

References

Houses on the National Register of Historic Places in Kentucky
Houses completed in 1820
National Register of Historic Places in Grant County, Kentucky
1820 establishments in Kentucky
Stone houses in Kentucky